The 1971 Indian general election in Jammu and Kashmir to the 5th Lok Sabha were held for 6 seats. Indian National Congress won 5 seats and an independent candidate from Srinagar constituency won 1 seat.

Constituency Details

Results

Party-wise Results

List of Elected MPs

See also 

 Elections in Jammu and Kashmir

References 

1971
1971
Jammu